Adolf Ferdinand Weinhold (19 May 1841 – 1 July 1917) was a German chemist, physician and inventor.

Life 
From 1857 to 1861 Weinhold studied chemistry and physics at universities in Göttingen and in Leipzig. His mentors were Otto Linné Erdmann and Friedrich Wöhler. In Germany, Weinhold worked after university studies as chemist and physician. He was appointed professor at Chemnitz University of Technology in 1870. In 1873 he was granted a D. Phil from the University of Leipzig.

In 1881, he applied the vacuum flask of James Dewar to chemistry, using it as a cold trap. The flask itself was patented in 1903 by the glassblower , who founded Thermos GmbH on its basis.

Works by Weinhold 
 Leitfaden für den physikalischen Unterricht (24 editions)
 Physikalische Demonstrationen – Anleitung zum Experimentieren im Unterricht an Gymnasien, Realschulen und Gewerbschulen (7 editions)
 Vorschule der Experimentalphysik – Naturlehre in elementarer Darstellung nebst Anleitung zur Ausfertigung der Apparate (5 editions)

References

External links 
 
 Chemnitz University of Technology:Life and works of Weinhold
 

1841 births
1917 deaths
People from Zwenkau
People from the Kingdom of Saxony
19th-century German chemists